Lemyra pseudoflammeoida is a moth of the family Erebidae. It was described by Cheng-Lai Fang in 1983. It is found in Jiangxi, China.

References

 

pseudoflammeoida
Moths described in 1983